Trzciniec  is a village in the administrative district of Gmina Radzanów, within Mława County, Masovian Voivodeship, in east-central Poland.

References

Villages in Mława County